The name John McLennan may refer to a number of people and similar spellings.

People bearing the name-

 John McLennan ( 1821 – 1893),businessman and politician, Ontario, Canada 
 John McLennan (1867  – 1935, a Canadian physicist

With a similar spelling:-

 John McLennon (1855 -  1888), a US Army musician
 John McLenan (1827–1865), an American illustrator